Inverin (meaning "mouth of the river") is a Gaeltacht village between Baile na hAbhann and Minna in County Galway, Ireland. There are Irish-language summer colleges in the area, most notably Coláiste Lurgan and Coláiste Uí Chadhain.

The village is on the R336 road and is served by the 424 Bus Éireann route from Galway.

Cumann Forbartha Chois Fharraige is a local development association founded in 1966. The Gaelic Athletic Association club, Cumann Lúthchleas Gael Mhícheál Breathnach, holds a Gaelic football tournament every year on Saint Stephen's Day. An Irish language book club in the village, Club Leabhar Chois Fharraige, meets monthly. 

The airline Aer Arann Islands is headquartered at Connemara Airport near the village.

People
 Calum Maclean, folklorist employed by the Irish Folklore Commission
 Sinéad Ní Neachtain, editor
 Aoife Ní Thuairisg, presenter
 Seán Ó Coisdealbha, poet and dramatist
 Fiontán Ó Curraoin, Gaelic footballer
 Pádraig Ó Finneadha, Irish scholar and doctor
 Dónall Ó Héalai, actor
 Pádraic Ó Neachtain, presenter and director

See also
 List of populated places in the Republic of Ireland
 Cló Iar-Chonnacht

References

External links 

Coláiste Lurgan

Gaeltacht towns and villages
Gaeltacht places in County Galway
Towns and villages in County Galway